The Make It Right Foundation is a non-profit foundation founded by American actor Brad Pitt in 2007. The foundation was established to aid in the environmentally friendly rebuilding of houses in New Orleans' Lower 9th Ward after Hurricane Katrina. The organization also built structures in Newark, New Jersey, and Kansas City, Missouri.

In 2018, Lower Ninth Ward residents filed suit against Make It Right, alleging that the nonprofit built and sold houses with "defective" materials that caused electrical and plumbing malfunctions, insufficient ventilation, and structural issues. As of early 2022, reports stated that only 6 of the original 109 homes built remained in "reasonably good shape," with many rendered uninhabitable, plagued by construction errors and mold issues.

History 

In December 2007, Brad Pitt and William McDonough, together with Graft Architects, founded Make It Right to rebuild 150 safe, energy-efficient and affordable homes for families from New Orleans Lower 9th Ward who lost everything to Hurricane Katrina. The foundation was advised on formation by Trevor Neilson and Nina Killeen, advisors to the Jolie-Pitt Foundation through their firm, Global Philanthropy Group.

On March 10, 2012, at the Hyatt Regency New Orleans, Pitt and Ellen DeGeneres hosted "A Night to Make It Right" with Drew Brees and Randy Jackson and performances by Rihanna, Sheryl Crow, Seal, Kanye West, Snoop Dogg, and Dr. John. Make It Right raised $5 million at the event, according to the New Orleans Times-Picayune. Over 1,200 attendees paid between $1,000 and $2,500 to dine on a meal created by celebrity chefs Emeril Lagasse and John Besh. A silent auction was also held to raise funds. The organization was bolstered by support from celebrities, such as Oprah Winfrey.

By March 2013, Make It Right had completed 90 of the proposed 150 homes. The homes in New Orleans were designed by renowned architects such as Frank Gehry, David Adjaye, and Shigeru Ban, and each home was LEED Platinum certified by the USGBC.

With their angular shapes and bold colors, the Make It Right houses were not typical of New Orleans. The organization implemented the holistic, eco-conscious Cradle to Cradle method of building, promising certifiably green construction that would benefit the homeowner. The homes were said to use 70% less energy than a conventional home of the same size. It took about $150,000 to build these homes,  labor included. If the costs exceeded the estimated price, the foundation would cover the difference.

Projects went beyond New Orleans. Make It Right partnered with HelpUSA in Newark, NJ to build a 56-unit multi-family building for disabled veterans. The LEED Platinum building opened on Memorial Day 2012. In Kansas City, Make It Right converted a school into 50 affordable rental units.

Decay problems, structural issues, and lawsuits 
The foundation came under fire in early January 2014 after over two dozen of the green homes built started exhibiting severe signs of rotting. The foundation reported that the homes used special wood products called TimberSIL which is advertised as free from many of the toxic ingredients. The wood was unable to withstand the extensive moisture that engulfs the city of New Orleans. The foundation announced they were prepared to pursue all legal remedies if necessary. In 2015, they sued the manufacturer for nearly $500,000, the alleged cost of replacing  rotting decks on 39 of the 109 houses built. In 2017, the suit was reportedly settled for an undisclosed amount.

In 2018, the year of the first of several lawsuits, it was reported that residents of the New Orleans Make It Right homes were complaining that many of the Make It Right homes were rotting and dangerous. They complained of mold and collapsing structures, electrical fires and gas leaks. The residents said the houses were built too quickly, with low-quality materials, and that the designs did not take into account New Orleans’ humid, rainy climate. Also, it was reported that Make It Right had not built a home, filed tax forms, or updated its website since 2015. The downtown New Orleans office had been closed, the staff had been cut to a handful, and residents said their calls went unreturned.

In October 2020, a Make It Right house designed by David Adjaye in New Orleans was slated for demolition, having been deemed unsafe for habitation. In early 2022, it was reported that only 6 of the 109 Make It Right houses remained in what an urban-studies researcher deemed to be "reasonably good shape."

In August 2022, the Civil District Court for Orleans Parish ordered the Make It Right foundation to compensate the 107 residents of the Lower 9th ward with $20M, each resident entitled to $25,000 as compensation for repairs.

See also
 New Orleans
 Hurricane Katrina
 Reconstruction of New Orleans

References

External links
 Official Website
 CNN, "Brad Pitt works to 'make it right' in New Orleans", 4 December 2008
 Huffington Post, "Brad Pitt On Today: Make It Right, Marriage, Adoption Fears (VIDEO)", 2 December 2008
 BusinessWeek, "Brad Pitt Aims to Make It Right", Alec Appelbaum, 17 December 2007
 New York Times, "Brad Pitt Commissions Designs for New Orleans", Robin Pogrebin, 3 December 2007
Times-Picayune, http://www.nola.com/arts/index.ssf/2012/03/brad_pitts_make_it_right_gala.html
O Magazine, Amanda Little, September 2010
Times-Picayune,  Doug MacCash, 10 November 2012
Times-Picayune,  Doug MacCash, 9 March 2012

Hurricane Katrina disaster relief
Hurricane Katrina recovery in New Orleans
Non-profit organizations based in Louisiana
Organizations established in 2007
Brad Pitt